Tanea picta is a species of predatory sea snail, a marine gastropod mollusk in the family Naticidae, the moon snails.

Description

Distribution

References

 Hollman M. (2008) Naticidae. In Poppe G.T. (ed.) Philippine marine mollusks, vol. 1: 482-501, pls 186-195. Hackenheim: Conchbooks

Naticidae
Gastropods described in 1844